WQHR is an American radio station in Presque Isle, Maine. It is a Top 40/CHR formatted station owned by Townsquare Media. It currently carries The Bob and Sheri Show. The transmitter is in Mars Hill, Maine.

External links

Previous Logos

QHR
Contemporary hit radio stations in the United States
Mass media in Aroostook County, Maine
Presque Isle, Maine
Radio stations established in 1981
Townsquare Media radio stations